Omar Khribin (can also be spelled as Kharbin or Kh'rbin; born 15 January 1994) is a Syrian professional footballer who plays as a forward for Emirati Shabab Al Ahli on loan from Al-Wahda (Abu Dhabi) and the Syrian national team. He can be deployed as a left winger or second striker.

In 2017, Khribin became the first Syrian ever to win the Asian Footballer of the Year.

Club career

Early career 
Karbin played four seasons for Al-Wahda in the Syrian Premier League. In the Summer of 2013, Khribin joined Al-Quwa Al-Jawiya In the Iraqi Premier League, on a two-year loan. On 6 August 2015, Khribin signed for Al-Mina'a, on a one-year loan.

Al-Hilal
On 19 June 2017, Al-Hilal officially bought Khribin for 44 million riyals on a four-year contract. On 10 August, Omar scored his first goal against Al-Taawoun in the 14th minute, winning 4–3.

Pyramids (loan)
In January 2019, Khribin moved to Egyptian side Pyramids on a loan deal until the end of the 2018–19 season; he scored in his first match against Zamalek on 24 January, and four goals in his first 5 matches.

Return to Al-Hilal
Khribin rejoined Al-Hilal in summer 2019; he played at the 2019 FIFA Club World Cup, becoming the first Syrian to do so.

Al-Wahda
In January 2021, Khribin joined Emirati club Al-Wahda.

International career
On 20 November 2012, Khribin was called up for the Syria national team and made his first international friendly games against Palestine.

In the 2018 FIFA World Cup qualification, he was part of the 10 matches in the third round and the two matches against Australia in the fourth round, he just scored 10 goals in the qualifiers, of which 7 in the second round.

In the 2019 AFC Asian Cup, he played the whole 90 minutes of the three group stage matches. He scored a goal against Australia, as Syria exited with just one point out of three matches.

In September 2019, the Syrian Football Federation announced that Khribin was suspended from the national team due to multiple instances of uninformed absence. Khribin later returned to play against Maldives on 10 October. In November 2020, he mentioned that he was excluded from the national team coached by Nabil Maâloul, after he had suggested to play as a second striker.

Club career statistics

International

Scores and results list Syria's goal tally first, score column indicates score after each Khribin goal.

Honours
Al-Hilal
 Saudi Professional League: 2016–17, 2017–18, 2019–20
 King's Cup: 2017, 2019–20
 Saudi Super Cup: 2018
 AFC Champions League: 2019, runner-up 2017

Syria
 WAFF Championship: 2012

Individual
 AFC Champions League Top Scorer: 2017
 Asian Footballer of the Year: 2017

References

External links
 
 

1994 births
Living people
Sportspeople from Damascus
Syrian footballers
Association football forwards
Al-Wahda SC (Syria) players
Al-Quwa Al-Jawiya players
Al-Mina'a SC players
Al Dhafra FC players
Al Hilal SFC players
Pyramids FC players
Al Wahda FC players
Shabab Al-Ahli Club players
Syrian Premier League players
Iraqi Premier League players
UAE Pro League players
Saudi Professional League players
Egyptian Premier League players
Syria international footballers
2019 AFC Asian Cup players
Syrian expatriate footballers
Syrian expatriate sportspeople in Iraq
Syrian expatriate sportspeople in the United Arab Emirates
Syrian expatriate sportspeople in Saudi Arabia
Syrian expatriate sportspeople in Egypt
Expatriate footballers in Iraq
Expatriate footballers in the United Arab Emirates
Expatriate footballers in Saudi Arabia
Expatriate footballers in Egypt
Asian Footballer of the Year winners